Olszak may refer to:

Places
Olszak, Greater Poland Voivodeship (west-central Poland)
Olszak, Masovian Voivodeship (east-central Poland)
Olszak, West Pomeranian Voivodeship (north-west Poland)

People with the surname
Wacław Olszak (1868-1939), Polish physician and politician

See also
Olschak

Polish-language surnames